Azerin (born 9 May 1971) is an Azerbaijani singer and senior lieutenant.

Career
Five-year old Azerin became the soloist of the Azerbaijan State Television and Radio. In 1990 Azerin won an award in the Baki payizi-90 (Baku Autumn-90) music contest, and then in 2001 she won an award in "The voice of Asia" music contest, in Republic of Kazakhstan. Azerin has performed in the United States, South Korea, Belarus, Kazakhstan, Georgia, the Netherlands, Belgium, Italy, Israel, Lithuania, Latvia, China, Denmark, the United Kingdom, (Germany), Austria, Sweden, Russia, and Turkey. Azerin hosted several successful TV shows. In 2006, she was awarded the title of Honored Artist of the Azerbaijan Republic, and in 2015 was designated People's Artist of the Azerbaijan Republic.

Discography

Albums
 "Azerin 1" 2001
 "Çırpınırdın Karadeniz" 2003 
 "Azerin 2" 2006
 "Yüreklerde biriz" 2015

References

1971 births
Living people
21st-century Azerbaijani women singers
Azerbaijani film actresses
Musicians from Baku
People's Artists of Azerbaijan
Soviet Azerbaijani people
Azerbaijani women pop singers